Nong Bon Water Sports Center is a largest public park in Bangkok with an area of , it is considered larger than the adjacent well-known Suan Luang Rama IX.

Bueng Nong Bon (Nong Bon Lake) is an artificial lake to support the amount of water runoff from the east to prevent flooding during the flood season (around October). It is one of the royal projects initiated by King Rama IX.

The beautiful area of the reservoir has been developed into a public park and water sports center of Bangkok Metropolitan Administration (BMA), open to the general public. It offers windsurfing, kayaking and sailing, with an annual service fee of only 40 baht.

For those who bring pets, there is also a dog park zone available.

Along the banks is a beautifully landscaped suitable for recreation and photography, especially at sunrise and sunset.

Open daily from 5:30 am – 6:00 pm.

Notes

External links

Prawet district
Parks in Bangkok
Lakes of Thailand